The Kwun Tong line extension (abbreviated KTE) is an extension of the MTR rapid transit network in Hong Kong. It extends the existing train service of Kwun Tong line to Ho Man Tin station and Whampoa station. Construction started on 25 July 2011 and opened for service on 23 October 2016.

History 
During the bid for Sha Tin to Central Link (SCL) in 2000s, in order to win the project, Mass Transit Railway proposed to extend the Kwun Tong line while Kowloon–Canton Railway suggest to construct an Automated People Mover in Whampoa.

After the MTR–KCR merger in 2007, Hong Kong government appointed MTR to construct the SCL according to KCR proposal, while also extend the Kwun Tong line to Whampoa. The benefits are better transfer arrangement at Ho Man Tin station and other SCL interchange stations.

Stations 
 Ho Man Tin
 Whampoa

Notes
During peak hours, half of the Kwun Tong line trains terminate at Ho Man Tin, another half terminates at Whampoa. Passengers who head for Whampoa but take the wrong train to Ho Man Tin will need to change to the next train at Ho Man Tin. In off peak hours, all Kwun Tong line trains terminate at Whampoa.

References 

Kwun Tong line